Anestis Nastos (born 28 April 1989) is a Greek professional footballer who plays as a centre-back for Greek club Aiolikos.

Early career

Nastos started his career from the academies of Ilisiakos and he then signed for the seniors team.

Club career

Nastos started his career in Ilisiakos F.C. and after 2 years in which he made 23 appearances without scoring a single goal, he signed for Egaleo, from which he left 1 year later. He then moved to Volos for the side of Niki Volou F.C. He left after 1 season in which he made just 1 appearance. During the 2011–12 season he signed for Ethnikos Asteras F.C. in which he scored his first, but he left after just 1 season to sign for AO Kerkyra. But after just 6 months, he left to sign for Fokikos A.C. During the 2013–14 and 2014–15 seasons he played for Paniliakos F.C. and Panegialios F.C. Where he had a total of 46 appearances and 2 goals. In 2015, he signed for Olympiacos Volou FC before moving to the historic side of Crete, OFI 1 year later. During the 2019–20 season, he was the captain of OFI in the Greek Super League.

Personal life
Nastos holds both Greek and Albanian nationality, due to his Albanian descent from his mother's side.

Honours

Club
OFI Crete
Football League: 2017–18

References

External links

1989 births
Living people
Greek people of Albanian descent
Association football defenders
Super League Greece players
Ilisiakos F.C. players
Egaleo F.C. players
Niki Volos F.C. players
Ethnikos Asteras F.C. players
A.O. Kerkyra players
Fokikos A.C. players
Paniliakos F.C. players
Panegialios F.C. players
Olympiacos Volos F.C. players
OFI Crete F.C. players
Liga II players
FC Rapid București players
Greek expatriate footballers
Greek expatriate sportspeople in Romania
Expatriate footballers in Romania
Footballers from Athens
Greek footballers